Nasus is Latin for nose or snout, and appears in many related terms.

Biology

Medicine 
 Nasus externus, the external nose.
 Auris Nasus Larynx, a medical journal ("Ear Nose Throat")

Zoology

Fish species 
 Gogonasus, a Devonian fish and link to early tetrapods
 Barbus nasus, a Cyprinid fish
 Bassozetus nasus, a cusk-eel
 Chondrostoma nasus, nase
 Coilia nasus, an anchovy
 Coregonus nasus, broad whitefish
 Lamna nasus, porbeagle, a shark
 Menticirrhus nasus, highfin king croaker, (see kingcroaker)
 Nematalosa nasus, Bloch's gizzard shad (see Clupeidae)
 Ostracion nasus, shortnose boxfish (see boxfish)
 Parodon nasus (syn: Parodon tortuosus), freshwater fish (see Characidae)
 Typhlonus nasus, a cusk-eel (see Ophidiidae)
 Xenotilapia nasus, a Cichlid

Other species 
 Brookesia nasus, a small chameleon
 Conopsis nasus, a snake
 Hylodes nasus, Santa Catarina Tree Toad, (synonyms include: Hyla nasus, Elosia nasuta, Elosia nasus, Enydrobius nasus, Elosia nasus nasus)

Morphology 

 Nasus or fontanellar gun, the hornlike frontal projection of some termites

Other uses

Fictional characters 
 Nasus, the Curator of the Sands, a playable champion character in the multiplayer online battle arena video game League of Legends

Geography 
Nasus (Greece), a town of ancient Acarnania, Greece